Nanamonodes is a genus of moths of the family Noctuidae. The genus was erected by George Hampson in 1914.

Species
Nanamonodes albilinea Hampson, 1914 Venezuela
Nanamonodes trilineata Schaus, 1914 French Guiana

References

Acontiinae